Valier is a village in Franklin County, Illinois, United States. The population was 669 at the 2010 census.

History

Valier was founded in the early 1900s and named for William Valier, who owned the land upon which the community was established.  While a stop along the Chicago, Burlington and Quincy Railroad, the community didn't experience notable expansion until the opening of a coal mine nearby in 1917.  The mine operated off and on until closing for good in 1960.

Geography
Valier is located in western Franklin County at  (38.015927, -89.041029).

Demographics

As of the census of 2000, there were 662 people, 271 households, and 199 families residing in the village. The racial makeup of the village was 98.19% White, 0.76% Native American, and 1.06% from two or more races. Hispanic or Latino of any race were 0.15% of the population.

There were 271 households, out of which 31.7% had children under the age of 18 living with them, 61.6% were married couples living together, 7.0% had a female householder with no husband present, and 26.2% were non-families. 21.0% of all households were made up of individuals, and 9.2% had someone living alone who was 65 years of age or older.  The average household size was 2.44 and the average family size was 2.86.

In the village, the population was spread out, with 24.3% under the age of 18, 8.2% from 18 to 24, 29.2% from 25 to 44, 22.4% from 45 to 64, and 16.0% who were 65 years of age or older.  The median age was 37 years. For every 100 females, there were 94.1 males.  For every 100 females age 18 and over, there were 92.7 males.

The median income for a household in the village was $31,397, and the median income for a family was $43,056. Males had a median income of $34,375 versus $18,750 for females. The per capita income for the village was $16,366.  About 5.2% of families and 7.3% of the population were below the poverty line, including 6.5% of those under age 18 and 4.8% of those age 65 or over.

References

Villages in Franklin County, Illinois
Villages in Illinois
Populated places in Southern Illinois